Rhytiphora amicula is a species of beetle in the family Cerambycidae. It was described by White in 1859. It is known from Australia.

References

amicula
Beetles described in 1859